ML-154 (NCGC-84) is a drug which acts as a selective, non-peptide antagonist at the neuropeptide S receptor NPSR. In animal studies it decreases self-administration of alcohol in addicted rats, and lowers motivation for alcohol rewards, suggesting a potential application for NPS antagonists in the treatment of alcoholism.

See also 
 Neuropeptide S receptor

References 

Phosphorus compounds
Sulfur compounds
Phenyl compounds
Alkene derivatives
Quaternary ammonium compounds
Bromides